The large myotis (Myotis chinensis) is a species of vesper bat. It is found in central and southeast China, Hong Kong, Myanmar, Thailand, and northern Vietnam. It is also expected to occur in northern Laos, but not yet documented there.

References

Mouse-eared bats
Bats of Asia
Mammals of China
Mammals of Hong Kong
Mammals of Myanmar
Mammals of Thailand
Mammals of Vietnam
Taxa named by Robert Fisher Tomes
Mammals described in 1857
Taxonomy articles created by Polbot